Piper High School is a public high school located in Sunrise, Florida, one of the nation's fastest growing cities. The school is a part of the Broward County Public Schools district.

The school serves over 2,500 students from grades 9 through 12. The athletic teams are known as the Bengals.

It serves:  most of Sunrise, northwest sections of Lauderhill, a section of North Lauderdale, and a section of Tamarac.

History

Roma Adkins became the principal in 1994.

Demographics
As of the 2021–22 school year, the total student enrollment was 2,229. The ethnic makeup of the school was 21.4% White, 73.8% Black, 16% Hispanic, 1.8% Asian, 2.2% Multiracial, 0.6% Native American or Native Alaskan, and 0.2% Native Hawaiian or Pacific Islander.

Notable alumni 

 Jessicka Addams, singer, artist
 Ken Bishop, NFL defensive tackle
 Bennie Blades, NFL defensive back
 Brian Blades, NFL wide receiver
 Albert Connell, NFL wide receiver
 Daniel Franzese, actor
 Kenneth Fuchs, composer
 Brian Gottfried, tennis player and coach
 Franco Grilla, football player
 Bobby Harden, NFL safety
 Quadtrine Hill, NFL football player
 Michael Irvin, NFL Hall of Fame wide receiver
 Nevin Lawson, NFL defensive back 
 Shannon Spake, ESPN NASCAR reporter
 Ski Mask the Slump God, rapper and songwriter
 Omar Wilson, philanthropist and entrepreneur
 Van Winitsky tennis player
 XXXTentacion, rapper, singer, and songwriter

References

External links 
 Piper High School (official site)

Broward County Public Schools
High schools in Broward County, Florida
Public high schools in Florida